Gujarat Gas Limited is an Indian natural gas distribution company, owned by Gujarat State Petroleum Corporation. Established in 1980, and headquartered in Ahmedabad, the company operates primarily in Gujarat. It is India's largest city gas distribution (CGD) company.

History 
Gujarat Gas Company Limited (GGCL) was incorporated in 1980, and is in the business of procurement and distribution of natural gas. The company went public in October 1991, listing on the Bombay Stock Exchange and the National Stock Exchange. The BG Group acquired a majority stake in the company in 1997. 
In October 2012, the majority owner in the firm, BG Group, sold its 65% stake for a fee of around $470 million. The buyer was GSPC Gas, a unit of the state-run Gujarat State Petroleum Corporation (GSPC). GSPC Gas and GGCL were merged in 2015 and the new company was named Gujarat Gas Limited.

Operations 
As of May 2015, Gujarat Gas Limited has City Gas Distribution (CGD) network in 649 human settlements (city, town, villages) in 19 districts of Gujarat and Union Territory of Dadra and Nagar Haveli and Thane GA (including Palghar district) of Maharashtra.

As of 2017, it has the largest customer base in gas distribution sector in India: 10,80,000 domestic households, 2,835 industrial customers, 11,900 commercial and non-commercial customers, 233 CNG stations selling more than 7,65,000 kg of CNG per day serving to more than 1,60,000 vehicles per day. It has achieved the highest total daily gas sales volume in India, up to 6.5 million cubic metre per day at standard conditions. It market capitalisation was Rs. 10,600 crore (15 May 2015).

References

Companies based in Ahmedabad
Oil and gas companies of India
Utilities of India
Energy in Gujarat
Non-renewable resource companies established in 1980
Natural gas companies of India
1980 establishments in Gujarat
Indian companies established in 1980
Companies listed on the National Stock Exchange of India
Companies listed on the Bombay Stock Exchange